Smart message is  a communications protocol designed by Intel and Nokia by which various software upgrades—including ringtones—can be made "over the air", through the wireless connection.

Smart Messaging is basically a special type of short message, with its own prefixes and codes, that makes it possible for the phone to recognize the message as, instead of a text message to the attention of the user, a "functional" message that should be treated as: a ringtone, a screen logo, in some cases even a business card or group graphics that can be used to identify who is calling.

Mobile telecommunication services